Michał Walski (born 27 February 1997) is a Polish professional footballer who plays as a central midfielder for Sandecja Nowy Sącz.

External links

References

1997 births
Living people
Association football midfielders
Polish footballers
Poland youth international footballers
Ekstraklasa players
I liga players
II liga players
Pogoń Szczecin players
Stal Mielec players
Ruch Chorzów players
Sandecja Nowy Sącz players
People from Tarnobrzeg
Sportspeople from Podkarpackie Voivodeship